Miss America 2009, the 82nd Miss America pageant, was held on the Las Vegas Strip in Paradise, Nevada on Saturday, January 24, 2009.

The pageant was broadcast live on TLC from the Theatre for the Performing Arts at the Planet Hollywood Resort and Casino, only the fourth time that the pageant has been held outside Atlantic City, New Jersey.

Selection of contestants
One delegate from each state was chosen in state pageants held in mid-2008. Prior to competing in state pageants, the majority of delegates first were required to win a local title. Each delegates title is pre-dated to 2008, for example Amanda Tapley is "Miss Alabama 2008" rather than "Miss Alabama 2009".

Many contestants competed in state pageants in both the Miss America and Miss USA systems numerous times before winning titles, and some had previously in other states to those which they won their state title.

All contestants were required to be between the ages of 17-24, unmarried and a citizen of the United States. They were also required to meet residency and education requirements.

Competitions
All delegates competed in an interview competition with the judges, based on their platform issue, and also in the swimsuit, evening gown and talent competitions.

Prior to the nationally televised competition, the delegates participated in three nights of preliminary competition, where preliminary award winners were chosen in each category.

During the final telecast, following the announcement of the semi-finalists, the top fifteen competed in swimsuit competition. The top twelve competed in evening gown competition. The top ten went on to compete in the talent competition, and the top seven each faced a random question from an American viewer.

Results

Placements

* - America's Choice chosen from TLC show, Miss America: Countdown to the Crown

Awards

Preliminary awards

Quality of Life award

Other awards

Judges
The seven judges for the competition were:
 former model, Paige Adams-Geller
 actress and singer, Laura Bell Bundy
 Miss America 1999, Nicole Johnson
 Olympic swimmer, Cullen Jones
 casting director, Beth Klein
 hairstylist, Ken Pavés

Delegates

References

External links
 Miss America official website

2009
2009 in the United States
2009 beauty pageants
2009 in Nevada
Events in Las Vegas
January 2009 events in the United States
Zappos Theater